This is a list of state prisons in Virginia. It does not include federal prisons or county jails located in the Commonwealth of Virginia.

 Augusta Correctional Center (operating capacity 1,097 inmates)
Appalachian Detention Center
 Baskerville Correctional Center (capacity 488)
 Bland Correctional Center (capacity 621)
 Brunswick Work Center (capacity 708)
 Buckingham Correctional Center
 Caroline Correctional Unit (capacity 137)
 Central Virginia Correctional Unit #13 (capacity 250)
 Coffeewood Correctional Center (capacity 1,193)
 Cold Springs Correctional Unit (capacity 150)
 Culpeper Correctional Facility for Women (closed as of 2014)
 Deep Meadow Correctional Center (capacity 840)
 Deerfield Correctional Center (capacity 1,069)
 Dillwyn Correctional Center (capacity 1,106)
 Fluvanna Correctional Center for Women
 Green Rock Correctional Center (capacity 987)
 Greensville Correctional Center
 Halifax Correctional Unit (capacity 248)
 Haynesville Correctional Center (capacity 1,141)
 Haynesville Correctional Unit (capacity 112)
 Indian Creek Correctional Center (capacity 1,002)
 James River Correctional Center (closed April 1, 2011)
 Keen Mountain Correctional Center (capacity 879)
 Lawrenceville Correctional Center (capacity 1,548; operated by GEO Group as Virginia's only private state prison)
 Lunenburg Correctional Center (capacity 1,186)
 Marion Treatment Center (capacity 371)
 Mecklenburg Correctional Center (closed 2012)
 Nottoway Correctional Center
 Patrick Henry Correctional Unit (capacity 136)
 Pocahontas State Correctional Center
 Powhatan Correctional Center (capacity 449) Closed 2015
 Red Onion State Prison
 River North Correctional Center (capacity 1,000)
 Rustburg Correctional Unit (capacity 152)
 St. Brides Correctional Center
 Sussex I State Prison
 Sussex II State Prison
 Virginia Correctional Center for Women
 Wallens Ridge State Prison
 Wise Correctional Unit (capacity 108)

References

External links
Virginia Department of Corrections

Virginia
 
Prisons